Chortero is a village in the municipality Sintiki, Macedonian region of Greece, 24 km from the city of Serres. As of 2011, Chortero comprises 628 inhabitants, the majority of whom are farmers. Potatoes are the main crop.

Its football team is named Elpis Chorterou.

References

Populated places in Serres (regional unit)